The pubs and inns in Grantham reflect to a great extent the history of the town, soke, and Parliamentary constituency of Grantham, Lincolnshire, England.

"Blue" pubs 

Grantham’s various "blue" pubs are one example of this.  The area has had, in its history, pubs named the Blue Pig, the Blue Lion, the Blue Horse, the Blue Dog, the Blue Bull, the Blue Cow, the Blue Ram, the Blue Sheep, the Blue Lamb, and (a single human amongst the animals) the Blue Man.  (There is also a small street, Blue Gate.)  The Blue Bull, Cow, Dog, and Fox are/were all in Colsterworth, which was part of Grantham soke when it was enclosed in 1805–1808.  The Blue Pig, Ram, and Man are/were in Grantham proper.

These names have their roots in a 19th-century political rivalry over the membership of Parliament for the constituency of Grantham, between the Manners family (the Duke of Rutland from Belvoir Castle) and the Brownlow family (from Belton House).  Pubs in the constituency declared political allegiances, and acted as gathering places for supporters of political factions.  Where a person drank declared that person's political views.

The Manners family were Whigs and chose blue as their colour.  They bought several pubs and inns in the constituency, and added "blue" to their names. People could drink "blue ale" in the "blue" pubs, which was an inducement to vote for Whig candidates in the parliamentary elections.

Grantham also once had a Manners Arms, named after William Manners, Baronet, which no longer exists.  The Huntingtower Arms in Grantham was also named after him.  No pub was named after his son Frederick Tollemache, Liberal member of Parliament for the constituency, by the Manners family, although a statue to him exists in Grantham town.  However, in the 20th century the building of the defunct Co-operative department store in the town (in St Catherine's Road) was taken over by the Wetherspoons franchise and turned into a public house, The Tollemache.

The constituency of Grantham was a pocket borough, whose elections were controlled by its landowners.  There was no secret ballot, and voters were paid for casting their votes.  Since the Restoration in 1660 these landowners had been Lord Brownlow and the Duke of Rutland, and their descendants.  In 1802, William Manners owned nearly all of the houses, and pubs and inns, in the borough.  The 1802 election was fiercely contested by Manners, and after three days the results were:

Welby (who took the seat) and Thornton were supported by Lord Brownlow and the Duke of Rutland.  Manners and Danvers were supported by William Manners. Before this election, voters had been paid two guineas per candidate for their votes.  With this election, the price rose to ten guineas per voter per candidate.

The following advertisement was published before the 1830 election in Grantham:

  Frederick Tollemache
  A "plumper" here is a vote where the voter has cast only one of the two votes available to him.
  Sir Montague Cholmeley, 2nd Baronet

The Angel Inn 

In 1812, Lord Brownlow sold his property in Grantham to William Manners, including another pub, The Angel Inn, which had taken its name from stone carvings of angels on the front of the building.

The gateway arch of the Angel Inn, as it stood in the 19th century, was older than the rest of the front of the building.  On either side of the arch were carved heads of Edward the Third and of Queen Philippa his consort.  These, with an oriel window above, can still be seen today.  Also still to be seen today is the gold-painted carved wooden figure of an angel over the entrance, beneath the oriel.  Such a wooden figure, dating as it does to earlier than the seventeenth century, is rare for an inn.  The entrance dates to the Tudor period, as do portions of the courtyard buildings.  Other rarities to have survived in the Inn include the stone twin-panel vaulting in the interior ceilings of the bay windows.  The front of the building is built in ashlar, of local oolithic stone.  The Angel thus lays claim to being the oldest surviving Inn in England, sitting on what was once the Great North Road.

It is widely held that the Angel Inn was once a "commandery of the Knights Templar" (as reported in both White's 1846 History, gazetteer, and directory of Leicestershire and Allen's 1834 History of the county of Lincoln).  However, the Reverend B. Street, curate of Grantham, stated in 1857 after his own investigations that "such is not the case".  "I have read a document drawn up at Grantham, October 15, 1291," he wrote, "which certainly refers to the property, as belonging to the Knights Templars, but not as being a Preceptory of the Order.".

According to Street, the Angel Inn was Knights Templars property that was a hostelry for travellers and pilgrims.  It was seized from the Templars, by the Sheriff of Lincolnshire, on 7 January 1308, in accordance with the following writ issued by King Edward the Second on 15 December 1307:

The second writ, born to the Sheriff by one of the King's Clerks of Council, which the Sheriff and the twelve men all had to swear to follow before being told its contents, was:

Street believes that the Angel Inn, having been seized by the king, probably then became the property of the Knights Hospitallers.  He bases this conclusion on the presence of the arms of the Hospitallers on the East window of Grantham church in 1662 (as recorded by Gervase Holles in Notes of Arms in Grantham Church, a manuscript held in the British Museum), in place of the arms of the Templars that had been there, indicating that the Templars' property in Grantham had passed to the Hospitallers.

Street also records the Angel Inn as having been used to hold court by Kings John (on 23 February 1213) and Richard the Third (on 19 October 1483).  He also states that it was probably used by King Charles the First on 17 May 1622.

At the time of Richard III, the large room over the gateway of the Angel Inn was called La Chambre le Roi (the King's Chamber).  Street concluded that this room's name came from Norman French, and probably from the visit to Grantham that John paid in 1213 (during which he delivered Letters Patent at Grantham granting the release of Lucian of Arquill).  The evidence for Richard III's visit he took from Rymer's Fædera, as quoted in Halstead's History of Richard the Third, which said that the Great Seal, used for issuing a death warrant, was delivered to the king by messenger "in a chamber called the King's chamber in the Angel Inn, in the presence of the Bishops of Worcester, Durham, St David's, and St Asaph, and of the Earls of Northumberland and Huntingdon, and of Sir Thomas Stanley".

As is still recorded today on the charity board of Grantham church (in the ringing chamber of the church's bell tower), in 1706 a Mr. Michael Sullivan left a benefaction to the church for a sermon against drunkenness, to be paid by the Angel Inn. As recorded in the Grantham Register the benefaction was:

The Beehive 

The Beehive public house in Grantham sports a real bee hive as its pub sign.  The hive is in a tree that grows directly in front of the pub.  Beneath the hive is a plaque, bearing the following poem:
Stop Traveller! This wondrous sign explore
And say, when thou has viewed it o'er,
Now Grantham, now two rarities are thine:
A lofty steeple and a living sign.
The "lofty steeple" is that of the parish church of St Wulfram, which is only a few hundred metres from the pub.

Other pubs 

Other present and past pubs in Grantham include:
Edward granted Le George to Cecily Neville, Duchess of York on 1 June 1461. In her will of April 1495, she in turn bequeathed it to "Dame Jane Pesemershe, widow" for her lifetime.  Le George reverted to the Crown in 1606, at that time known as the Queen's Inn, called Le George.
The George, built in 1780, is possibly related to a hospitium called Le George, presented by King Edward the Fourth to his mother, which was demolished in 1780.  
The George, where Charles Dickens and Hablot Knight Browne stayed on 30 January 1838 on their way to Yorkshire, where they were researching Nicholas Nickleby.  
The Chequers Inn in Butchers Row, demolished in the 1880s, only to be replaced by a pub of the same name.
Artichoke House on Swinegate, a former pub.
The Crown and Anchor, a couple of doors down from the Blue Pig, that closed in 1936.
The Horse and Jockey, near Welby Street, demolished in the 1950s and now the site of the Horse and Jockey Yard, a park named after the pub.
Gravity, a pub formerly called the Hogshead, in a building that used to be the location of a Woolworth's store in the 1960s.
The Plough Inn, on Welby street, which closed in 1958 and was demolished in 1982.
The Durham Ox, on the corner of Welby Street and Wharf Road, which ceased to be a pub in 1961, and was demolished in order to build the Isaac Newton Centre in 1983.
The Royal Queen, Belton Lane.

See also
 List of pub topics

References

Further reading 
  The history of the Angel and Royal according to its current owners.

Buildings and structures in Grantham
Pubs in Lincolnshire